Bliss Release is the debut album by Australian band Cloud Control. The album was released in May 2010 and peaked at number 20 on the ARIA Charts.

At the ARIA Music Awards of 2010, the album was nominated for ARIA Award for Breakthrough Artist - Release and ARIA Award for Best Rock Album.

At the J Awards of 2010, the album was nominated for Australian Album of the Year.

At the AIR Awards of 2010, the album won Best Independent Album and Breakthrough Independent Artist.

In 2011, the album won the Australian Music Prize.

Reception 

The Age said "The buzz around Cloud Control is entirely warranted – expect big things from this four-piece"

The Sydney Morning Herald said "Let’s be frank, a bloody impressive album".

Track listing

Charts

Personnel
Alister Wright – lead vocals, rhythm guitar
Heidi Lenffer – vocals, keyboards
Ulrich Lenffer – drums, percussion
Jeremy Kelshaw – vocals, bass guitar

References

2010 albums
Cloud Control albums
Ivy League Records albums